The 1997 Páginas Amarillas Open was a women's tennis tournament played on outdoor clay courts in Madrid in Spain that was part of Tier III of the 1997 WTA Tour. It was the second edition of the tournament and was held from May 19 through May 24, 1997. Jana Novotná won the singles title.

Winners

Women's singles

 Jana Novotná defeated  Monica Seles 7–5, 6–1
 It was Novotná's 4th title of the year and the 80th of her career.

Women's doubles

 Mary Joe Fernández /  Arantxa Sánchez Vicario defeated  Inés Gorrochategui /  Irina Spîrlea 6–3, 6–2
 It was Fernández's 3rd title of the year and the 26th of her career. It was Sánchez Vicario's 3rd title of the year and the 76th of her career.

 
Paginas
WTA Madrid Open (tennis)
Paginas